The 2003 Winchester Council election took place on 1 May 2003 to elect members of Winchester District Council in Hampshire, England. One third of the council was up for election and the Liberal Democrats stayed in overall control of the council.

Background
20 were contested in the election with the election in Droxford, Soberton and Hambledon being a by-election after the previous Conservative councillor resigned. 2 other seats saw the sitting councillor standing down, Owslebury and Curdridge and St Luke, while 3 of the Liberal Democrat cabinet members were defending seats.

Election result
The election saw the Liberal Democrats just keep a majority on the council with 29 of the 57 seats. However they lost 4 seats to the Conservatives and 2 to Labour.

Ward results

Bishop's Waltham

Colden Common and Twyford

Compton and Otterbourne

Denmead

Droxford, Soberton and Hambledon

Itchen Valley

Littleton and Harestock

Owslebury and Curdridge

St Barnabas

St. Bartholomew

St. John and All Saints

St. Luke

St. Michael

St. Paul

Swanmore and Newton

The Alresfords

Upper Meon Valley

Whiteley

Wickham

Wonston and Micheldever

References

2003
2003 English local elections
2000s in Hampshire